Frank Portelli may refer to:

 Frank Portelli (artist) (1922–2004), Maltese artist and mural painter
 Frank Portelli (politician) (born 1944), member of the Maltese Parliament